Woodville, North Carolina may refer to:

Woodville, Bertie County, North Carolina
Woodville, Cherokee County, North Carolina
Woodville, Perquimans County, North Carolina
Woodville, Surry County, North Carolina
Lewiston Woodville, North Carolina (Bertie County)

See also  
Woodville (disambiguation)